In topology, a branch of mathematics, a prime manifold is an n-manifold that cannot be expressed as a non-trivial connected sum of two n-manifolds. Non-trivial means that neither of the two is an n-sphere.
A similar notion is that of an irreducible n-manifold, which is one in which any embedded (n − 1)-sphere bounds an embedded n-ball. Implicit in this definition is the use of a suitable category, such as the category of differentiable manifolds or the category of piecewise-linear manifolds.

The notions of irreducibility in algebra and manifold theory are related. An irreducible manifold is prime, although the converse does not hold. From an algebraist's perspective, prime manifolds should be called "irreducible"; however the topologist (in particular the 3-manifold topologist) finds the definition above more useful. The only compact, connected 3-manifolds that are prime but not irreducible are the trivial 2-sphere bundle over the circle S1 and the twisted 2-sphere bundle over S1.

According to a theorem of Hellmuth Kneser and John Milnor, every compact, orientable 3-manifold is the connected sum of a unique (up to homeomorphism) collection of prime 3-manifolds.

Definitions 
Consider specifically 3-manifolds.

Irreducible manifold 
A 3-manifold is  if any smooth sphere bounds a ball. More rigorously, a differentiable connected 3-manifold  is irreducible if every differentiable submanifold  homeomorphic to a sphere bounds a subset  (that is) which is homeomorphic to the closed ball

The assumption that the sphere is smooth (that is, that it is a differentiable submanifold) is however important: indeed the sphere must have a tubular neighborhood.

A 3-manifold that is not irreducible is called .

Prime manifolds
A connected 3-manifold  is prime if it cannot be expressed as a connected sum  of two manifolds neither of which is the 3-sphere  (or, equivalently, neither of which is homeomorphic to ).

Examples

Euclidean space 
Three-dimensional Euclidean space  is irreducible: all smooth 2-spheres in it bound balls.

On the other hand, Alexander's horned sphere is a non-smooth sphere in  that does not bound a ball. Thus the stipulation that the sphere be smooth is necessary.

Sphere, lens spaces 
The 3-sphere  is irreducible. The product space  is not irreducible, since any 2-sphere  (where  is some point of ) has a connected complement which is not a ball (it is the product of the 2-sphere and a line).

Prime manifolds and irreducible manifolds 
A 3-manifold is irreducible if and only if it is prime, except for two cases: the product  and the non-orientable fiber bundle of the 2-sphere over the circle  are both prime but not irreducible.

From irreducible to prime 
An irreducible manifold  is prime. Indeed, if we express  as a connected sum

These two (now united) 2-spheres form a 2-sphere in  The fact that  is irreducible means that this 2-sphere must bound a ball. This operation though simply gives a 3-sphere.

From prime to irreducible 
Let  be a prime 3-manifold, and let  be a 2-sphere embedded in it. Cutting on  one may obtain just one manifold  or perhaps one can only obtain two manifolds  and  In the latter case, gluing balls onto the newly created spherical boundaries of these two manifolds gives two manifolds  and  such that

Since  is prime, one of these two, say  is  This means  is  minus a ball, and is therefore a ball itself. The sphere  is thus the border of a ball, and since we are looking at the case where only this possibility exists (two manifolds created) the manifold  is irreducible.

It remains to consider the case where it is possible to cut  along  and obtain just one piece,  In that case there exists a closed simple curve  in  intersecting  at a single point.

References

See also 
 3-manifold
 Connected sum
 Prime decomposition (3-manifold)

Manifolds